Dr. István Ács (September 18, 1928 – July 22, 2018) was a Hungarian jurist and politician, who served as the last Chairman of the Council of Debrecen between October 11, 1966 and December 31, 1989.

References

External links
 Debrecen polgármesterei, tanácselnökei 

1928 births
2018 deaths
Hungarian jurists
Mayors of places in Hungary
People from Debrecen